Frederiks Haab is a settlement on the island of Saint Croix in the United States Virgin Islands.

History
The plantation Frederiks Haab was for a while owned by Jens Friedenreich Hage.

References

Populated places in Saint Croix, U.S. Virgin Islands
Buildings and structures associated with the Hage family